Mariam Khutsurauli (born 15 January 1960) is a Georgian poet, writer and Jurist.

Biography 
Mariam Khutsurauli (she is also known by her literary pseudonym Sanata) was born in Telavi, Georgia.

She graduated from the law department of Tbilisi State University in 1982. She worked as a lawyer for various state organizations of Georgia.

Mariam Khutsurauli's verses was published in the Georgian literary magazine 'Literaturuli Palitra' (The Literary Palette) in 2011. She is an author seven poetic and short-short stories collections, edited by Miho Mosulishvili. Her poems have been translated into English language by Manana Matiashvili.

Mariam Khutsurauli is the poetess who writes remarkable verses in a dialect of Pshavi, which is a small historic region of northern Georgia. In her poems, it is possible to discover the original poetic world.

Songs by Teona Kumsiashvili "Rosa canina" and "On motive of Pshavi" based on Mariam Khutsurauli's verses became hits on social networks.

In 2011 Mariam Khutsurauri was the founder of Women's Literature Competition 'Khvaramzeoba'.

Literary works

Books
 Sanata's book, Poems, 2009, 
 The book of Sanata, Poems, 2012, 
 Sanata's House, Poems, 2012, 
 Sanata's Chest, Short stories, 2012,  
 The flower smiles in color of fire, Poems, 2016, 
 To mow near the sky, Short stories, 2016,  
 Through beams of diamonds, Audio-poems, 2016
 Salt To Taste, Short stories, 2020,

Children's books
 A Girl Named Kesane Came with Her Spring, Short stories, 2020,

Awards
 Literary Award "Saba" in the nomination "The Best Criticism, Essayistic and Documentary Prose of the Year" for the book "Salt To Taste" (2021)

References

Sources
 'Who will play with me' by Mariam Khutsurauli
 Xucʻurauli, Mariam. Poems. Selections
 

1960 births
Living people
Poets from Georgia (country)
Women poets from Georgia (country)
Tbilisi State University alumni
20th-century writers from Georgia (country)
21st-century writers from Georgia (country)
20th-century women writers from Georgia (country)
21st-century women writers from Georgia (country)
Jurists from Georgia (country)